The 2004 Under-16 European Promotion Cup for Women was the third edition of the basketball European Promotion Cup for U16 women's teams, today known as FIBA U16 Women's European Championship Division C. It was played in Andorra la Vella, Andorra, from 20 to 24 July 2004. Luxembourg women's national under-16 basketball team won the tournament.

Participating teams

Final standings

References

2004
2004–05 in European women's basketball
FIBA U16
Sports competitions in Andorra la Vella
FIBA